Rainbow Man is the debut studio album by American country music artist Jeff Bates. It was released in 2003 (see 2003 in country music) on RCA Nashville. The album includes eleven songs, all co-written by Bates, of which three were singles: "The Love Song", the title track, and "I Wanna Make You Cry". Respectively, these peaked at numbers 8, 47, and 23 on the Billboard country charts. "Long, Slow Kisses" was re-recorded for his next album, Leave the Light On, from which it was released as the lead-off single.

The album was produced by Kenny Beard and David Malloy, with additional production from Scott Hendricks on tracks 1, 4, and 6.

Track listing

Personnel

 Jeff Bates – lead vocals
 Larry Beaird – acoustic guitar
 Mike Brignardello – bass guitar
 Mickey Jack Cones – background vocals
 Eric Darken – percussion
 Chip Davis – background vocals
 Larry Franklin – fiddle
 Paul Franklin – steel guitar
 Kevin "Swine" Grantt – bass guitar
 David Grissom – electric guitar
 Tony Harrell – keyboards, piano
 Aubrey Haynie – fiddle
 Mike Johnson – steel guitar
 Jeff King – electric guitar, slide guitar
 Troy Lancaster – electric guitar
 Michael Landau – electric guitar
 B. James Lowry – acoustic guitar
 Gordon Mote – Hammond organ, piano, synthesizer, synthesizer strings, Wurlitzer
 Jimmy Nichols – piano
 Joe Spivey – fiddle, mandolin
 Russell Terrell – background vocals
 John Willis – banjo, acoustic guitar
 Lonnie Wilson – drums, percussion
 Glenn Worf – bass guitar
 Jimmy Yeary – electric guitar
 Jonathan Yudkin – octophone, strings

Chart performance

References

External links
[ Rainbow Man] at Allmusic

2003 debut albums
Jeff Bates albums
RCA Records albums
Albums produced by David Malloy